Clew Bay is a natural ocean bay in County Mayo, Ireland. It contains Ireland's best example of sunken drumlins.

The bay is overlooked by Croagh Patrick to the south and the Nephin Range mountains of North Mayo. Clare Island guards the entrance of the bay. From the southwest part of the bay eastwards are Louisburgh, Lecanvey, Murrisk, and Westport; north of Westport is Newport, and westwards from there lies Mulranny, gateway to Achill. From the south side of the bay, between Clare Island and Achill, Bills Rocks can be seen.

History 

The bay was anciently known in Irish as Cuan Mod[h] ("Mod Harbour") or Modlind ("Mod Pool"), and was associated with the Fir Bolg. Some writers claim that this name derives from Modh, one of the Tuatha Dé Danann. Another possibility is the Old Irish mod, moth, which meant "penis"; it is possible that the bay was imagined as a penis thrusting into the land.

Another old name is Cuan Umaill ("harbour of Umhaill"), which was rendered in English as "Bay of the Owly", and then "Bay of the Owles." The English names Bay of Borace, Horrus, Baragh and Boruce are all recorded, all references to Burrishoole (Buiríos Umhaill). The name Clew Bay, of uncertain origin, first appears in a 1714 map; it may be derived from cliath, "hurdle".

Clew Bay was the focus of the O'Malley family possessions in the Middle Ages, and is associated especially with Grace O'Malley (or Granuaile). She is known as the Pirate Queen who commanded a fleet of ships and maintained several castles, including those on Clare Island, Achill and Rockfleet.

During the Irish Civil War in July 1922, 400 Free State troops were landed at Clew Bay to take Westport and Castlebar from Anti-Treaty forces.

Inishgort Lighthouse 
Inishgort Lighthouse stands on the island of Inishgort,  from Murrisk.

Fish farming in Clew Bay 
In recent years there has been controversy over fish-farming in the bay. "The Organic Salmon Company" (now owned by Mowi) is based in Clare Island.

Gallery

Islands of Clew Bay
The bay is also home to Dorinish, a private island purchased by John Lennon in 1967. Glenans Ireland, a non-profit sailing school, had a branch on Collanmore Island where sailing was taught.

Legend has it that Clew Bay has 365 islands in it—"an island for every day of the year". The large number of drumlins at the east end of the bay gave rise to this myth, but in fact there are not so many.

Drumlin islands, sandbars, and rocks

This chart shows the relative positions of the islands, sandbars, and rocks in the eastern half of Clew Bay. There are 141 named islands and islets within the bay.

See also
Clew Bay Heritage Centre
 Wild Atlantic Way

References

External links 
 
 Skippered charters on Clew Bay, with photos and information

Bays of County Mayo